The 1982–83 season was the 74th year of football played by Dundee United, and covers the period from 1 July 1982 to 30 June 1983. The team won the Scottish league championship for the first and only time, securing European Cup football for the following season.

Match results
Dundee United played a total of 55 competitive matches during the 1982–83 season.

Legend

All results are written with Dundee United's score first.
Own goals in italics

Premier Division

Scottish Cup

League Cup

UEFA Cup

League table

References

See also
 1982–83 in Scottish football

Scottish football championship-winning seasons
Dundee United F.C. seasons
Dundee United